The Malmö shootings were a string of attacks by Peter Mangs, a serial shooter lone wolf terrorist, also known as the Laser Man II, in the southern Swedish city of Malmö between December 2009 and October 2010. The shooter apparently targeted people with dark skin and non-Swedish appearance. As of 23 October 2010, as many as 15 shootings were linked to the same suspect.

Shootings
The attacks, carried out with a 9mm Glock 19 handgun, started as early as in December 2009. At the same time, the fatal shooting of a 20-year-old woman in October 2009 has also been linked to the same perpetrator. The woman was the only ethnically Swedish victim, who was in the company of a friend of immigrant origin. This murder has been linked to the other shootings through forensic evidence, showing that the weapon used was the same gun as the one used in several of the other attacks.

The attacks soon spread fear among the substantial immigrant population of Malmö. "Many people are frightened at the moment", said  Tahmoures Yassami, the leader of the Iranian-Swedish Association in Malmö, "especially families who have children." The local police warned against panic, pointing out that the risk for any individual of being shot was very low. At the same time, they cautioned people of ethnic minorities to avoid secluded areas after dark, which was when the attacks had been taking place.

Perpetrator
The shooter was compared to the likes of John Ausonius, dubbed the "Laser man", who committed similar crimes in 1991–92, targeting eleven men of immigrant origin in the Stockholm and Uppsala area, killing one.

On 6 November 2010, Swedish police announced that they had arrested a man they suspected was the shooter. According to Malmö police he was under suspicion of one murder and seven murder attempts. The man arrested was a 38-year-old Swedish man, Peter Mangs. He expressed strong anti-immigrant sentiments and admiration for John Ausonius. Just like Ausonius, Mangs had an immigrant background himself via a father born in Närpes, Finland. Mangs professed to feel alienated and frustrated with society. His lawyers argued that he had Asperger syndrome. Mangs suspected that he had the disorder since at least 2005, when he joined an association for people with Asperger syndrome, and was formally diagnosed in May 2009. He had a very high score of 19 on the Autistic Diagnostic Observation Schedule (ADOS).

Mangs was found guilty on two counts of murder and four counts of attempted murder, and given a life sentence. The Scania and Blekinge Court of Appeal denied an attempt by Mangs to overturn his sentence, convicting him of an additional three attempted murders, on 25 April 2013. A further request for appeal was denied by the Supreme Court in June of the same year.

List of suspected shootings
The following shootings have been connected to the same suspect:
2003 - Mangs shot dead an Iranian man in his apartment. 
10 October 2009 – 20-year-old Trez West Persson is shot and killed while sitting in a car in Västra Skrävlinge Kyrkoväg, near Malmö Mosque. Her 21-year-old friend, who is dark-skinned, is seriously injured.
23 October 2009 – Several shots are fired against an apartment in Hyacintgatan.
31 December 2009 – Shots are fired against the Malmö Mosque on Jägersrovägen. No one is hit, but an imam is injured in the neck by broken glass.
25 January 2010 – A 17-year-old boy is shot in the chest and a 36-year-old man in the leg outside a store in Rasmusgatan. Police suspect the 17-year-old was the target, while the 36-year-old was shot by accident.
12 March 2010 – Shots are fired against a house in Hårds väg. The target is probably the 22-year-old who escaped the attack on 10 October.
16 March 2010 – A 21-year-old and a 22-year-old are attacked at close range while sitting in a car in Professorsgatan. The 22-year-old is hit several times, while the 21-year-old escapes unscathed.
19 June 2010 – Three African men are shot at while exiting a taxi in Regementsgatan. One is hit, but receives only a burn wound.
26 June 2010 – A 30-year-old man is shot through the window of a gym in Vendelfridsgatan. He is hit twice in the back.
27 June 2010 – Only 40 minutes after the previous shooting, a 29-year-old is shot in the shoulder while sitting in a car in Munkhättegatan.
24 August 2010 – A fast food restaurant in Köpenhamnsvägen is shot at. The bullet goes straight through the building and hits a car at the other side, but no one is hit. The owner claims to have seen a laser light immediately before the shot was fired.
25 September 2010 – A 31-year-old man receives a flesh wound to the head when he is shot outside of the university hospital.
10 October 2010 – A 47-year-old man is shot in the stomach at the bus stop by the intersection of Lönngatan and Norra Grängesbergsgatan. The bullet goes through his body, the injuries were serious.
19 October 2010 – In an incident similar to the one of 10 October, a 28-year-old man is shot in the back at close range while waiting for the bus by Eriksfältsgatan. The bullet pierces the victim's lung, leaving serious damage.
21 October 2010 – A 16-year-old boy is fired at by Hermodalstorget, but he is not hit.
21 October 2010 – On the same night, two women are shot through a window in Kroksbäck.

References

Literature

External links

Skjutningarna i Malmö, archive copy of site by the Swedish police (in Swedish).
Map of recent shootings in Malmö, created by Sydsvenska Dagbladet (in Swedish).

Anti-Muslim violence in Europe
2009 murders in Sweden
2010 murders in Sweden
2000s in Malmö
2010s in Malmö
Deaths by firearm in Sweden
Hate crimes
Murder in Sweden
Racism in Sweden
Spree shootings in Sweden

sv:Peter Mangs